Charles Calhoun could refer to: 

Charles Calhoun Jr. (1931–2014), American jurist and legislator
Charles L. Calhoun (1925–2002), Master Chief Petty Officer of the U.S. Coast Guard
Charles W. Calhoun, American historian
Jesse Stone (1901–1999), American musician and songwriter who often used the pseudonyms Charles Calhoun or Chuck Calhoun